Terrance D. Carroll (born January 16, 1969) is an American lawyer, minister, former Colorado legislator and former Speaker of the Colorado House of Representatives, the first African American ever to hold that office in Colorado. Carroll was elected as a Democrat in 2002 and represented House District 7 which encompasses parts of Denver, Colorado.

Biography
Carroll was born and grew up in Washington, D.C., the only child of a single mother who was a share-cropper's daughter. He attended Fork Union Military Academy and H. D. Woodson High School and then graduated from Morehouse College in 1992 with a B.A. After graduating from Morehouse, Carroll moved to Colorado to pursue a PhD. in political science.  He took a job as a campus police officer but switched his educational interest from political science to religion.  He graduated from the Iliff School of Theology in 1999 with a Master of Divinity degree and the Harvard Divinity School, Center for the Study of Values in Public Life, Summer Leadership Institute in June 2000 and later became an ordained Baptist minister.  Carroll continued his education, entering in and graduating from the Sturm College of Law at the University of Denver in 2005 with a Juris Doctor.
While in law school he was appointed to an open seat in the Colorado House of Representatives in 2003.
Carroll currently practices in the area of litigation with the firm of Greenberg Traurig, LLP in downtown Denver.

Legislative career
Carroll represented district 7 in northeast Denver, and  has served as chairman of the House Judiciary Committee and Assistant Majority Leader. He decided to run for speaker in November, 2008, after the front runner for the job, Representative Bernie Buescher, was upset in his re-election bid. On Thursday, November 8, 2008, just two days after that election, democrats in the Colorado House of Representatives chose Carroll as Speaker.  He was sworn in as the 34th Speaker of the House at the opening of the Colorado General Assembly in January, 2009.  The Colorado constitution limits members of the Colorado House to four consecutive two year terms, Carroll's term ended in 2011.

Legislation
Carroll was known for his support of education reform. In 2008 Carroll along with former Colorado Senate President Peter Groff sponsored SB130, a bill that would allow Colorado schools the power to control their budgets and make their own decisions on hiring, curriculum, length of the school day and teacher compensation. He has sponsored bills to charter new schools and to standardize the calculation of high school graduation rates. Carroll has also worked on homeland security measures and civil and criminal justice issues.

He was also the original sponsor of the bill that established the Tuskegee Airmen Memorial Highway on Colorado's Interstate 70 to honor the African American flyers that served during World War II.

References

External links
 Legislative web site

1969 births
Living people
African-American state legislators in Colorado
Baptist ministers from the United States
Colorado lawyers
Harvard Divinity School alumni
Morehouse College alumni
Politicians from Washington, D.C.
Speakers of the Colorado House of Representatives
Democratic Party members of the Colorado House of Representatives
Politicians from Denver
Sturm College of Law alumni
21st-century African-American people
20th-century African-American people